Camp Ramah in the Berkshires, near Wingdale, New York, is one of nine overnight summer camps and three day camps affiliated with the Conservative Movement of Judaism and the National Ramah Commission. It is accredited by the American Camp Association.

Religious orientation
Camp Ramah is a religiously oriented camp that observes the laws of Shabbat and kashrut. Hebrew is widely used in all facets of camp life, from the names for buildings, physical infrastructure, and services, to camp activities and programs.
Campers attend daily religious prayer services. On Mondays, Thursdays, and Saturdays the campers execute the traditional Torah service. Campers also attend classes or programs that thecamp has set up to structure their Jewish background.

Counselors and alumni describe their summers at Ramah as one of the most formative experiences of their childhoods and a primary influence on their Jewish identity.

Administration
From 2003 until 2017, the camp director was Rabbi Paul Resnick.   Rabbi Jerome (Jerry) Abrams was the founder of the camp in 1964. He is now director emeritus. Rabbi David Mogilner, Rabbi Sheldon (Shelley) Dorph, David August, and Rabbi Burton Cohen were directors in late 1960 and 1970s.

Special programs
The camp annually holds a Labor Day weekend for alumni of the camp who are 22 years old and over.

Divisions
Campers are divided by age groups, called Edot in Hebrew:
  
Cochavim ("Stars"), entering 4th grade
Nitzanim ("Flower Buds"), entering 5th grade
Shorashim ("Roots"), entering 6th grade
Tzeirim ("Youths"), entering 7th grade
Solelim ("Pavers"), entering 8th grade
Bogrim ("Graduates"), entering 9th grade
Machon ("Institute") entering 10th grade
Gesher ("Bridge"), entering 11th grade

See also

Judaism
Jewish education

References

External links
 Camp Ramah in the Berkshires website 
 National Ramah Commission website
"Research Findings on the Impact of Camp Ramah," 2004
 Jewish Summer Camps in America 
Ramah at 60: Reflections

Berkshires
Ramah In The Berkshires
Buildings and structures in Dutchess County, New York
Tourist attractions in Dutchess County, New York
Conservative Judaism in New York (state)